John Anthony Mostil (June 1, 1896 – December 10, 1970) was an American center fielder in Major League Baseball who played his entire career for the Chicago White Sox (1918, 1921–29). Born in Chicago, Illinois, he had a career batting average of .301.

Career
Mostil led the American League in runs scored in 1925, and in stolen bases in 1925 and 1926. Mostil attempted suicide in 1927. He recovered, but only played two more years.
He hit .300 four times with a high of .328 in 1926.

In a 10-season career, Mostil posted a .301 batting average (1054-3507), with 23 home runs, 618 runs, and 375 RBI in 972 games played. His on-base percentage was .386 and slugging percentage was .427.

After baseball
After retiring as an active player, Mostil became a minor league manager and a scout for the White Sox. In the 1960s, he coached at the Chicago White Sox Boys Camp, a sports camp in Brothertown, Wisconsin, owned by the Chicago White Sox.  Mostil died at age 74 in Midlothian, Illinois.

See also
List of Major League Baseball annual runs scored leaders
List of Major League Baseball annual stolen base leaders
List of Major League Baseball career stolen bases leaders
List of Major League Baseball players who spent their entire career with one franchise

External links

References

American League stolen base champions
Major League Baseball center fielders
Chicago White Sox players
Chicago White Sox scouts
Baseball players from Illinois
1896 births
1970 deaths
Minor league baseball managers
Milwaukee Brewers (minor league) players
Toledo Mud Hens players
Little Rock Travelers players
Eau Claire Cardinals players
Eau Claire Bears players
Grand Forks Chiefs players
Jonesboro White Sox players
Waterloo Hawks (baseball) players
People from Midlothian, Illinois